The General Confederation of Liberal Trade Unions of Belgium (ACLVB or CGSLB) is the smallest of Belgium's three major trade union federations.

Unlike the other socialist and catholic federations, the ideology of the ACLVB-CGSLB is explicitly liberal. The federation traces its origins to 1891 and its membership numbered 295,600 in 2016.

Most trade unionists belong directly to the federation, but it has one affiliate, the Free Syndicate of the Public Services.  This represents all public sector workers.

Presidents
1920–1942: Paul Lamborelle
1944–1959: Adolphe Van Glabbeke
1959–1989: Armand Colle
1989–1994: Willy Waldack
1994–2006: Guy Haaze
2006–2015: Jan Vercamst
2015–present: Mario Coppens

References

Bibliography

External links

Official site

Trade unions in Belgium
Trade Union Advisory Committee to the OECD
European Trade Union Confederation